William Eskelinen (born 3 September 1996) is a Swedish professional footballer who plays for Örebro SK as a goalkeeper.

Career
Eskelinen started playing football for Skogås-Trångsunds FF at the age of five. As a 12-year-old he moved to the IF Brommapojkarna academy. Eskelinen started playing senior football at Division 2 club Värmdö IF in 2014.

In March 2015, Eskelinen was signed by Hammarby IF on a one-year contract and was immediately loaned back to Värmdö IF. In January 2016, Eskelinen extended his contract in Hammarby by one year. In March 2016, he was loaned out to the Division 2 club IFK Aspudden-Tellus on a loan agreement until the summer. In August 2016, Eskelinen was loaned out to the Ettan club Enskede IK.

In January 2017, Eskelinen was signed by GIF Sundsvall on a three-year contract. On 18 September 2017, Eskelinen made his Allsvenskan debut in a 2–1 win over AFC Eskilstuna, where he was substituted in the 35th minute for the injured Tommy Naurin.

In July 2019, Eskelinen signed a five-year contract with Danish Superliga club AGF. In March 2022, he returned to Sweden, signing a deal until the end of 2023 with Örebro SK.

Personal life
Eskelinen's father is the former professional footballer Kaj Eskelinen, who was a striker. William is of Finnish descent through his father.

References

External links 
 
  (archive)

1996 births
Living people
Swedish footballers
Swedish expatriate footballers
Sweden youth international footballers
Association football goalkeepers
Swedish people of Finnish descent
Skogås-Trångsunds FF players
IF Brommapojkarna players
Värmdö IF players
Hammarby Fotboll players
IFK Aspudden-Tellus players
Enskede IK players
GIF Sundsvall players
Aarhus Gymnastikforening players
Örebro SK players
Allsvenskan players
Superettan players
Ettan Fotboll players
Division 2 (Swedish football) players
Danish Superliga players
Swedish expatriate sportspeople in Denmark
Expatriate men's footballers in Denmark